re:Invent is a 37-story high-rise office building on the Amazon headquarters campus in Seattle, Washington, United States. It opened in 2019 and houses 5,000 employees as one of three major high-rise towers on Amazon's campus in the Denny Triangle neighborhood north of Downtown Seattle.

History

The site, located between the Amazon Spheres and Westlake Avenue, was formerly home to a Toyota car dealership that moved to SoDo in 2015. Unlike its neighboring towers, Doppler and Day One, construction of the third tower was delayed while the existing dealership building was re-used as a hub for Prime Now deliveries. The Prime Now hub was relocated to SoDo in October 2016 and construction on the third tower began the following month.

The building opened in June 2019 and was named "re:Invent" for an annual cloud computing conference hosted by Amazon. It houses 5,000 employees, primarily working for the company's cloud computing platform, Amazon Web Services, and also has ground-level retail spaces.

One of the retail spaces in the building is an Amazon 4-star store that sells items rated four stars or higher. It opened in August 2019. A food hall operated by San Francisco-based China Live was announced to occupy  of the building's retail space in February 2020, but was later delayed and ultimately cancelled due to the COVID-19 pandemic.

References

Amazon (company)
Amazon (company) facilities
Skyscraper office buildings in Seattle
Denny Triangle, Seattle
NBBJ buildings
Office buildings completed in 2019
Retail company headquarters in the United States
2019 establishments in Washington (state)